The Holding may refer to:
 The Holding (film), a 2011 British thriller film
 The Holding (Fear the Walking Dead), an episode of the television series Fear the Walking Dead

See also
 Holding (disambiguation)